The International House of Prayer (IHOPKC) is a charismatic evangelical Christian movement and missions organization based in Kansas City, Missouri, and the nearby suburb of Grandview that focuses on the inerrancy of scripture, and biblical prayer with worship.

It is best known for the prayer room which has run 24/7 with live worship teams since September 19, 1999, and simultaneously broadcast via its website and YouTube. Doctrinally, IHOPKC is evangelical, charismatic, post-tribulational, and affirms historic premillennialism. IHOPKC places great importance on the practices of bible study, prayer, worship, fasting, and works of justice.

Overview

History 
The International House of Prayer of Kansas City (IHOPKC) was founded by Mike Bickle on May 7, 1999. The organization began in a small building off Grandview Road in Kansas City, Missouri, as a prayer room dedicated to worshiping Jesus night and day. Since that time, IHOPKC has grown and spread out over several different locations throughout south Kansas City and Grandview, Missouri. , the church had over 1,000 staff and a student body of another 1,000 individuals.

On September 14, 2010 the International House of Pancakes announced that they were suing the International House of Prayer for trademark dilution and infringement. The lawsuit was dropped on December 21, 2010, with the dispute resolved out of court and the International House of Prayer began abbreviating itself as IHOPKC.

Prayer Format 
IHOPKC is best known for its prayer meetings based on its "harp and bowl" worship model which have been held 24 hours a day, seven days a week, 365 days a year since September 19, 1999. These prayer meetings, which are streamed live on the internet and through GOD TV, alternate regularly between music and prayer in two hour sets through all hours of the day and night. The prayer meetings are held at IHOPKC's 'global prayer room' in Grandview.

Teaching 
IHOPKC staff regularly teach on themes that include prayer, worship, the Great Commandment, the Great Commission, eschatology, understanding God's spiritual purposes for Israel, spiritual gifts, nazirite consecration, and various other charismatic themes.

Related organizations 
IHOPKC provided advice and financial support to anti-trafficking organization Exodus Cry, and listed them as a "related tax-exempt organization" on their 2018 tax filings.

International House of Prayer University 
The International House of Prayer University is an unaccredited Bible college with a campus at Grandview, Missouri. As of 2010, there were 1,000 full-time students enrolled. The educational process centers on prayer.

In 2010 the school invested $6 million to renovate part of a strip mall in Grandview for use as a new campus.

Controversies

Ernie Gruen controversy 
In early 1990 (9 years prior to the start of IHOPKC) Mike Bickle and the Kansas City Fellowship were highly criticized by Pastor Ernie Gruen in sermons and a well circulated 130-page document titled "Documentation of the Aberrant Practices and Teachings of Kansas City Fellowship".  In the sermons and document, Gruen criticized Bickle's teachings on eschatology and documented alleged cases of manipulative uses of prophecy at the Kansas City Fellowship. In 1993 Ernie Gruen and Mike Bickle released a joint statement declaring that the conflict was resolved.

God Loves Uganda documentary 
The 2013 documentary film God Loves Uganda suggests that North American evangelicals in general, and IHOPKC specifically, were responsible for Uganda's Anti-Homosexuality Bill.

Death of Bethany Deaton 
On October 30, 2012, former IHOPKC intern Bethany Leidlein Deaton was found dead in an apparent suicide. Days later, IHOPU student Micah Moore came forward to Grandview police, and was subsequently charged with Deaton's murder. In statements to police, Moore stated that he was part of a religious group with Bethany and her husband, Tyler Deaton. Moore also stated, while in custody, that Tyler Deaton had used his apparent influence over the group to initiate homosexual experiences with several male members of their social-religious circle, primarily with Moore, himself. He explained that he and Deaton were involved in a sexual relationship, but justified it under “religious experiences”. It was allegedly through the coercion of this relationship that Moore claimed group leader (and IHOPU graduate) Deaton ordered his wife's murder, to prevent her from revealing sexual assaults to her therapist from other men (Tyler excluded) within the group. While IHOPKC materials and website listed Tyler Deaton as a division coordinator for IHOPKC friendship groups until five days after Bethany's death, IHOPKC officials said that Tyler's group was not connected to IHOPKC or known about by IHOPKC leadership. Melanie Morgan, one of Moore's lawyers, said in early December 2012: "The facts suggest Bethany Deaton’s death was an unfortunate suicide and Micah Moore had nothing to do with that suicide."

On October 31, 2014, the Jackson County, Missouri prosecutor dismissed murder charges against Moore.

Trademark infringement 
The International House of Prayer was one of the seven defendants named in a lawsuit filed by IHOP, the Glendale, California-based restaurant chain, in September 2010, alleging trademark infringement. The restaurant dropped the lawsuit in December 2010.

See also 
Justice House of Prayer
Pasadena International House of Prayer
TheCall
Youth with a Mission
Lou Engle

References

External links 
 Official Site
 Forerunner Church website

1999 establishments in Missouri
Charismatic and Pentecostal organizations
Organizations based in Kansas City, Missouri
Protestantism in Missouri
Christian organizations established in 1999